Emily L. Morton (April 3, 1841 – January 8, 1920) was an American entomologist and scientific illustrator. She was a co-author at onset of The Life-Histories of the New York Slug Caterpillars series.

Life 
Emily L. Morton was born on April 3, 1814, in New Windsor, New York. At the age of thirteen, she came across a scientific book on insects with their Latin names and became interested in collecting books on insects.

Morton described Lepidoptera life histories in U.S. entomological circles acquiring, rearing, and illustrating the life stages.

She met other collectors through articles and advertisements in the journal The Canadian Entomologist. In 1893, Morton started cooperating with entomologist Harrison G. Dyar after they placed mutual ads for exchanges of moths, including limacodids in Entomological News.

She also supplied a researcher Alpheus Spring Packard, PhD, with rare specimens of insects injurious to forest and shade trees, such as Janassa lignicolor, Hyparpax aurora and others.

Morton sold eight specimens of her extensive collection of Lepidoptera in which she had hybridized several forms, to an English collector.

She is not known to have published her research results, however Morton became a co-author at onset of "The Life-Histories of the New York Slug Caterpillars" series.

In 1904, Morton's collection of insects was divided between the American Museum of Natural History, the Boston Society of Natural History, and private collectors.

Emily L. Morton died on January 8, 1920, in New Windsor.

References 

19th-century American women scientists
20th-century American women scientists
1841 births
1920 deaths
American entomologists
Women entomologists
People from New Windsor, New York